Haa District (Dzongkha: ཧཱ་; Wylie: Haa; alternative spellings include "Ha") is one of the 20 dzongkhag or districts comprising Bhutan. An alternative name for the district is "Hidden-Land Rice Valley." It the second least-populated dzongkhag in the country after Gasa. 

The most-spoken language of the district is Dzongkha.

The river Haa Chhu, originating at Jomolhari mountain, flows through the district.

Mystical history of Haa
The name Haa (pronounced "hah"), as well as the more ancient name Has (Dzongkha: ཧས་; Wylie: Has; pronounced "hay"), connotes esoteric hiddenness. Haa's major feature is the Haa Valley, a steep north-south valley with a narrow floor. The district is presided over by three mountains collectively referred as "Three Brothers" -- Jampelyang, Chana-Dorji, and Chenrezig.

Black, White, and Haa Gonpa temples
Local historians maintain that two important temples in Haa District, the Black Temple ( lhakhang Narpo )  and the White Temple ( lhakhang karpo ), were built at the same time as Kichu Temple in Paro in the 7th century AD.  The two temples can be found near each other at the sacred site known as Miri Punsum, or "The Three Brother Hills".  A third temple, Haa Gonpa, was built further up the valley at the site where a lame pigeon, actually a bodhisattva in disguised form, was found by a local farmer who was drawn to the spot by a mysterious fire seen on several successive nights and by the unexplained sounds of oboes and trumpets (musical instruments closely associated with Bhutanese and Tibetan monasteries).

During the 10th day of the 11th month of the Bhutanese calendar (see Tibetan calendar), liturgical ceremonies worshipping Amitabha Buddha are held at Haa Gonpa temple.

Sacred oak and the upper house
Near the Black Temple there are two houses near a sacred oak tree where the local deity once appeared as a winged creature, scaring the local people (the valley is divided into a number of areas, each under the influence of a particular local deity predating the arrival of Buddhism — see Bön religion).  The residents of the two houses gave offerings to the local deity.  The local deity, now appeased, visited the upper house while neglecting the lower.  The jealous owner of the lower house began an inter-house feud in which a man of the upper house was killed.  Every year 11th lunar month a series of special mystical practices are performed in the upper house for a week.

The local deity Chungdue
The famous Lam Pema Lingpa also documented the activities of another local deity known as Aup Chungdue.  Chungdue was responsible for meteor storms, cyclones, wildfires, rocks splitting apart, earthquakes, and a number of other mystical disasters.   The Guru Padmasambhava arrived in the late 8th century and subdued the deity.  However the deity's force is not to be taken lightly. In the 15th century aup  Chungdue decreed that the people of Ha Shogona village where not to come in contact with any followers of a certain monk in nearby Paro dzongkhag.  When a young Haa man married a girl from Paro they believed no harm would come to them.  However, as they crossed a river between the two districts the knots tying her infant to her back suddenly came loose and the baby fell into the river and drown.

Other features
Also near the Black and White temples is a special stupa  chorten marking the site where an imprint of Guru Padmasambhava's body and hat may be found in a large rock.In the Samar side-valley may be found a bridge known as Has Samarpudung.  Below the bridge is the lake of a wishing cow whose stone udders can be seen in the lake.

Population 
According to Census 2017, the population of the district was 13,655 in 2,952 households making it the second least populated dzongkhag in the country after Gasa.

Economy

Pastoralism 
In the northern part of the district, a temperate alpine area, yak rearing is the most sustainable occupation. Natural selection has given the yak a physiological design that makes its adaption to high mountains unrivalled by any other livestock. The pastoralists were inclined to keep an unexpectedly high number of male yaks due to the high price of yak meat. In 1993, the price for boneless yak meat stood at Nu 65 per kilogram, i.e. more than four times higher than beef. In the northern gewogs, the population also depend on making butter and cheese for their livelihood.

Agriculture 
Most of the district is unsuitable for agriculture. Traditionally, the main cereals grown in the dzongkhag was bitter and sweet buckwheat, barley, and wheat. In 2018, the cultivable land was around 2% of the total area in the district. Agriculture is further constrained by the prolonged winter and shorter growing seasons. Wheat is the main cereal crop grown in the district; other cereals crops are bitter barley and sweet buckwheat. Some rice is grown in the lower reaches of the valley. Potatoes, chilis, apples and other cash crops are grown by farmers on the valley floor, along terraced hillsides, and in some of the more accessible side valleys. Per the census, almost every household owns livestock of some type, most commonly yaks and cattle, but also chickens, pig, and horses. In the southern part of the district, cardamom and ginger constitute principal cash crops, while potato serves as the main cash crop in the north. Apples and vegetables are also cultivated on a moderate scale.

78% of Haa is covered with forest, and forestry plays an important part in local economy.

Geography

Haa District lies along the western border of Bhutan. To the northwest it is bounded by Tibet, to the southwest by Samtse District, to the southeast by Chukha District, and to the northeast by Paro District. Haa Dzongkhag covers a total area of 1905 sq km. The southern part of the district covers some sub-tropical area. However, the district is largely a temperate alpine area. Its northern part is above the tree line.

The gewogs of Bji, Katsho, Eusu, and Samar are in the north while Gakidling and Sombaykha are in the south.

Administrative divisions
Haa District is divided into six village blocks (or gewogs):

Bji Gewog
Gakiling Gewog
Katsho Gewog
Sama Gewog
Sangbay Gewog
Uesu Gewog

Tourism 

In 2002, subsequent to the 79th session of the National Assembly, the valley was opened to foreign tourism. The dzongkhag has 41 lhakhangs, which are owned by the government, community and private individual. The gewogs of Bje, Kar-tshog, Eusu and  Samar Gewogs are within radius of 15 km from dzongkhag administration. They have fairly good road network, electricity, telephone connectivity, water supply, and health facilities.

Haa valley–Saga La–Drukgyal Dzong trek is an easy trek of 23km that can be covered in two-three days. This trek is also called the 'Haa Planters' Trail' as it was used by rice planters from the valley to reach Paro to work as farm labourers during the planting season (mainly May-June). In return, the people of Haa received red rice after the autumn harvest. The trek passes through villages in the valley and dense forests near Paro. The trek ends near Drukgyal Dzong. On a three-day trek, one can stop at Yangtong. Alternatively, one can also stay at Khadey Ghom. The trek on the second day can end at Dongney Tsho.

Other treks that start from the valley include Haa valley–Nub Shona Patta Tho–Rigona, and Haa Valley–Amo Chhu–Phuentsholing.

Environment
Haa contains Torsa Strict Nature Reserve, one of the environmentally protected areas of Bhutan. Torsa contains no human inhabitants other than military patrols and posts, occupying substantial portions of the gewogs of Bji and Sangbay. Torsa is connected to Jigme Dorji National Park via biological corridor, cutting across the northeastern half of Haa District.

Military
The Indian Army maintains a military base in the valley to maintain security against incursions from China. The Chinese military has built roads into the Torsa Strict Nature Reserve and Haa District over the past dozen years clearly visible on Google Earth/Maps and other viewing platforms.

See also
Districts of Bhutan
Paro Province

References

Sources
 Tshewang, Lam Pema (2001) History of the Has (Ha) Valley in Journal of Bhutan Studies Volume 5, Winter 2001  p. 50-56. Thimphu: Center for Bhutan Studies.
 Seeds of Faith: A Comprehensive Guide to the Sacred Places of Bhutan. Vol 1. 2008 KMT Publishers, Thimphu, Bhutan.

External links
Five year plan 2002-2007
A History of Has (Ha) Valley by Lam Pema Tshewang, The Journal of Bhutan Studies, Vol. 5
Arjun Razdan, 'Forbidden Pastures of Haa Valley'
About Haa valley

 
Districts of Bhutan
Buddhism-related lists
Tourism articles by importance
Buckwheat
Rice